Dave Cummings is an American entrepreneur and CEO of the high-frequency trading firm Tradebot, founded in 1999.  He also is the founder of the BATS Global Markets stock exchange. He graduated from Purdue University and previously worked for Cerner before founding his own companies.

He was inducted into the Kansas Business Hall of Fame in 2015.

References

Purdue University alumni
American financial businesspeople
American stock traders
21st-century American businesspeople
Year of birth missing (living people)
Living people
People from Parkville, Missouri
American chief executives